The 2021–22 Melbourne Stars season was the eleventh in the club's history. The team was coached by David Hussey and captained by Glenn Maxwell, which they had competed in the BBL's 2021–22 season.

Squad information

The current squad of the Melbourne Stars for the 2021–22 Big Bash League season as of 5 February 2021.
 Players with international caps are listed in bold.

Season results and standings

Ladder

Regular season

Notes

References

Melbourne Stars seasons
2021–22 Australian cricket season